The discography of the French pop singer Vanessa Paradis consists of seven studio albums—M&J (1988), Variations sur le même t'aime (1990), Vanessa Paradis (1992), Bliss (2000), Divinidylle (2007), Love Songs (2013) and Les sources (2018). Simultaneously, she released four live albums, Live (1994), Au Zénith (2001), Divinidylle Tour (2008) and Une nuit à Versailles (2010). Her discography also features a greatest hits collection entitled Best of Vanessa Paradis (2009) and two soundtracks; namely Atomik Circus (2004) by The Little Rabbits and Un monstre à Paris (2011) recorded with -M-.

Albums

Studio albums

Live albums

Soundtracks

Compilations

Singles

As lead artist

As featured artist

Notes
A  The Bungalow! album by De la Simone charted at number 155 in France.

References

General

Specific

Discographies of French artists
Pop music discographies